Tiisetso Makhubela (born 24 April 1997) is a South African soccer player who plays as a defender for Mamelodi Sundowns FC and the South Africa women's national team.

References

1997 births
Living people
South African women's soccer players
South Africa women's international soccer players
Women's association football defenders
2019 FIFA Women's World Cup players